Novo is a rural locality (a village) in Gorod Vyazniki, Vyaznikovsky District, Vladimir Oblast, Russia. The population was 8 as of 2010.

Geography 
Novo is located near the Velikoye Lake, 17 km northeast of Vyazniki (the district's administrative centre) by road. Luzhki is the nearest rural locality.

References 

Rural localities in Vyaznikovsky District